The 1996 Oakland Raiders season was their 37th in the league. They were unable to improve upon their previous season's output of 8–8, winning only seven games. This was the team's third consecutive season in which they failed to qualify for the playoffs. Afterwards head coach Mike White was fired in only his second season. He was 15-17 overall head coaching the Raiders.

Offseason

NFL draft

Roster

Schedule

Standings

Season summary

Week 6 at Jets

References

Oakland Raiders seasons
Oakland Raiders
Oakland